Deng Mingjiang (born 18 June 1960) is a Chinese water conservation engineer who is the director of Erqisi River Basin Development and Construction Administration, and an academician of the Chinese Academy of Engineering.

Biography 
Deng was born in Leiyang County, Hunan, on 18 June 1960. He earned his Bachelor of Engineering degree from Xinjiang Agricultural University in 1982 and Doctor of Engineering degree from Hohai University 2007, respectively.

In February 2015, he became vice president of the Science and Technology Association of Xinjiang Uygur Autonomous Region. On 15 May 2018, he was recruited by Xinjiang Agricultural University as a tenured professor and doctoral supervisor.

Honours and awards 
 2009 State Science and Technology Progress Award (Second Class)
 2014 State Science and Technology Progress Award (Second Class)
 27 November 2017 Member of the Chinese Academy of Engineering (CAE)

References 

1960 births
Living people
People from Leiyang
Engineers from Hunan
Xinjiang Agricultural University alumni
Hohai University alumni
Members of the Chinese Academy of Engineering